Frederico da Cunha Paredes (31 January 1889 – 4 November 1972) was a Portuguese épée fencer. He completed individually and with the team at the 1920, 1924 and 1928 Olympics and won a team bronze medal in 1928; his teams placed fourth in 1920 and 1924.

References

External links
 

1889 births
1972 deaths
Sportspeople from Lisbon
Portuguese male épée fencers
Olympic fencers of Portugal
Fencers at the 1920 Summer Olympics
Fencers at the 1924 Summer Olympics
Fencers at the 1928 Summer Olympics
Olympic bronze medalists for Portugal
Olympic medalists in fencing
Medalists at the 1928 Summer Olympics
19th-century Portuguese people
20th-century Portuguese people